Railway Modeller is a monthly British magazine about model railways now published by Peco Publications in Beer, Devon. It has been in publication since 1949 with Vol. 1 No. 1 published as The Railway Modeller, being an Ian Allan Production for October-November, 1949. It is still Britain's most popular model railway title. Its first editor was G. H. Lake, the current editor is Steve Flint.

Features
The leading feature is the "Railway of the Month". Also included every month are descriptions of other model railway layouts from both individual modellers as well as groups and clubs, together with a scale drawing of either prototype locomotives, coaches, wagons or buildings and structures. Another established monthly feature is "Plan of the Month", a layout suggestion which may be based on a real or fictional place in the UK. "Shows You How" model making articles are included as well: covering items from building loco kits and rolling stock to scenic items or electrical projects. A special section for the newcomer and less experienced modeller is included under the title of "Railway Modelling Explored"

Other regular monthly features are; "Latest Reviews" in which the latest products, books and videos/DVDs are reviewed, "News" brings the latest stories from the world of model railways as well as preserved railways in the UK, "Societies and Clubs" provides the most comprehensive listings of railway modelling and model railway exhibitions, events and meetings available.

"Scale Drawings" is a regular monthly feature, in which for many years, until his death in 2000, Ian Beattie was a regular contributor with his "Drawn and Described" articles covering UK railway locomotives. Today the feature includes locos, rolling stock and lineside buildings, all drawn to scale, usually 4 mm - ft.

Continental Modeller 
A sister publication, Continental Modeller, covers modelling of foreign subjects, but still aimed mostly at modellers based in the UK.

See also 
 List of railroad-related periodicals
 C. J. Freezer, editor (1950–1978)

References

External links 
Current month's contents (Official site)

Magazines established in 1949
Rail transport modelling publications
Monthly magazines published in the United Kingdom
1949 establishments in the United Kingdom